Mark Perry may refer to:

Sports
 Mark Perry (amateur wrestler), college wrestler at University of Iowa, assistant coach at Arizona State University
 Mark Perry (English footballer) (born 1978), former footballer with QPR
 Mark Perry (Scottish footballer) (born 1971), formerly with Dundee United and Aberdeen

Entertainment
 Mark Perry (author) (born 1950), American author
 Mark Perry (impressionist), British impressionist known from 2DTV and Dead Ringers
 Mark Perry (musician), British fanzine publisher and musician
 Mark B. Perry, American television producer and writer

Other
 Mark J. Perry, professor at the University of Michigan-Flint
 Mark Perry (politician), member of the Arkansas House of Representatives